Graphite is the sixth studio album by Polish gothic rock band Closterkeller. It was released on April 26, 1999 in Poland through Metal Mind Productions. The album was recorded at Q-Sound studio in March 1999. The cover art was created by Tomasz "Graal" Daniłowicz and fotos by Edward Wosk and Marcin Wegner. English version of album was released on March 12, 2003 in United States through Pitchfork Promotions.

Graphite is considered to be one of the most important albums in the history of Polish rock.

Track listing

Track listing (english release)

Personnel
 Anja Orthodox - vocal, keyboards, effects, lyrics
 Paweł Pieczyński - guitar
 Krzysztof Najman - bass
 Gerard Klawe - percussion
 Michał Rollinger - keyboards
 Tomasz "Mech" Wojciechowski - keyboards
Music - Closterkeller.

Music videos
 "Na krawędzi" (1999)
 "Czas komety" (1999)

Release history

Original release

English release

References 

1999 albums
Closterkeller albums
Metal Mind Productions albums
Polish-language albums